Western Gate may refer to:
 Kangla Sanathong
 Point Conception